David Lawrence Prager (born January 17, 1977) is one of the co-founders and Vice President of Special Projects for Revision3. He has also worked for ZDTV, TechTV, and G4.

Early life
Prager graduated from Trinity University in San Antonio, Texas with a degree in Communication and Media Studies.

Career
Prager's first job after school was as a network administrator for the software company, Bowne Litigation Solutions based in San Antonio, Texas.

Prager was hired by ZDTV in 1999. He worked as a broadcast television producer, technology writer, and journalist in his time with ZDTV and TechTV.

Prager remained as a segment producer for the nightly G4techTV technology show The Screen Savers. Later, the show would switch gears, becoming the variety show Attack of the Show!. Prager left G4 in the spring of 2005.

Prager is an occasional participant on This Week in Tech, a podcast hosted by the popular TechTV personality, Leo Laporte.

Prager is one of the founders of Revision3 which was acquired by Discovery Communications. Prager was the Vice President of Special Projects for Revision3. He also helped out with Diggnation, the weekly podcast/vidcast about the social bookmarking news and technology website Digg.com. The hosts Kevin Rose and Alex Albrecht often spoke with him or ask questions during tapings of the show.

References

External links
G4 Interview with David Prager 
Revision3
Interview with David Prager Video
Pragers' Squarespace Blog

1977 births
Living people
Writers from San Francisco
Television personalities from San Francisco
American bloggers
TechTV people